Novosphingobium lindaniclasticum  is a Gram-negative, aerobic, rod-shaped, non-spore-forming and non-motile bacterium from the genus Novosphingobium which has been isolated from a hexachlorocyclohexane dumpsite in Lucknow in India. Novosphingobium lindaniclasticum has the ability to degrade hexachlorocyclohexane.

References

Bacteria described in 2013
Sphingomonadales